António Jorge Rodrigues Amaral (born 20 June 1955 in Lisbon) is a Portuguese former football goalkeeper and manager.

External links

1955 births
Living people
Footballers from Lisbon
Portuguese footballers
Association football goalkeepers
Primeira Liga players
Liga Portugal 2 players
S.U. Sintrense players
C.S. Marítimo players
Vitória F.C. players
FC Porto players
S.C. Farense players
F.C. Penafiel players
Varzim S.C. players
Louletano D.C. players
F.C. Tirsense players
Portugal international footballers
Portuguese football managers
Liga Portugal 2 managers
F.C. Vizela managers
F.C. Penafiel managers
F.C. Maia managers
C.D. Feirense managers
U.S.C. Paredes managers
G.D. Chaves managers
A.D. Lousada managers
South China AA managers
Portuguese expatriate football managers
Expatriate football managers in Hong Kong
Portuguese expatriate sportspeople in Hong Kong